Courvoisier v. Raymond, 23 Colo. 113 (1896), was a case decided by the Colorado Supreme Court that affirmed the use of a reasonableness standard when determining the validity of a mistaken self-defense.

Factual background
Courvoisier was a jewelry store owner, and he was awoken in the middle of the night when robbers tried to break into his store.  He retrieved his revolver and chased them outside.  Raymond was a Denver police officer who began to approach Courvoisier, and Courvoisier shot him.  Courvoisier said that he mistook Raymond for a robber, but the trial court found for Raymond.

Decision
The Colorado Supreme Court reversed the decision for Raymond because of faulty jury instructions in the trial court.  The trial court failed to give the instruction that Courvoisier should not be held liable if his mistake that Raymond was a robber was reasonable given the circumstances.

References

1896 in United States case law
United States tort case law
Colorado state case law
1896 in Colorado
Self-defense